Dejair Jorge Ferreira (born 14 December 1977), known as Dejair, is a Brazilian former professional footballer who last played in Major League Soccer for Chivas USA after signing in September 2008. He has played in Brazil for Botafogo, Sampaio Corrêa, Moto Club, ABC, Olaria, Vila Nova, Vitória, Criciúma, Atlético Mineiro, São Caetano, Náutico and Ceará.

References

External links
 
 
 

1977 births
Living people
Brazilian footballers
Chivas USA players
Expatriate soccer players in the United States
Major League Soccer players
Association football midfielders
Footballers from Brasília